Melvin Plet (born 18 July 1974 in The Hague) is a Dutch footballer who played for Eerste Divisie and Eredivisie clubs Dordrecht'90, Roda JC and TOP Oss during the 1995–2002 football seasons.

Honours
Roda JC
KNVB Cup: 1996–97

References

External links
Voetbal International profile

Dutch footballers
Footballers from The Hague
FC Dordrecht players
Roda JC Kerkrade players
TOP Oss players
Eredivisie players
Eerste Divisie players
1974 births
Living people
Association football defenders
Association football midfielders